Break or Breaks or The Break may refer to:

Time off from duties
 Recess (break), time in which a group of people is temporarily dismissed from its duties
 Break (work), time off during a shift/recess
 Coffee break, a short mid-morning rest period in business
 Annual leave (holiday/vacation), paid time off work

Time off from school 
 Holiday break, a U.S. term for various school holidays
 Christmas break or Winter break, a break in the winter, typically around Christmas and New Years
 Spring break, a recess in early spring at universities and schools in various countries in the northern hemisphere
 Summer break, a typical long break in the summertime

People 
 Ted Breaks (1919–2000), English professional footballer
 Danny Breaks (active 1990s–), British drum and bass DJ, record producer and record label owner

Sport
 , the first shot meant to break the balls in cue sports, also a series of shots in snooker
 Breaking ball, a pitch that does not travel straight like a fastball as it approaches the batter
 Surf break, place where a wave collapses into surf
 Horse breaking, the process of training a horse to be ridden
 Break (tennis), to win a tennis game as the receiving player or team, thereby breaking serve

Technology

Computing
 Break condition, in asynchronous serial communication
 Break key, a special key on computer keyboards
 break statement, a keyword in computer programming used for flow control
 Line break (computing), a special character signifying the end of a line of text
 To break (or "crack") an encryption cipher, in cryptanalysis

Other technologies
 Brake (carriage), a type of horse-drawn carriage used in the 19th and early 20th centuries
 Break (locksmithing), a separation between pins of a lock
 Breakover angle, a maximum possible supplementary angle of terrain
 Paradelta Break, an Italian paraglider design

Arts and media

Books
 The Break (novel), 1957, by José Giovanni
 The Break, 2016, by Katherena Vermette
 The Breaks (novel),  by Richard Price

Film and television
 Break (2008 film), an American action film
 Break (2014 film), also known as Nature Law
 Break (2020 film), a British independent film
 The Break (1995 film), an American tennis film
 The Break (1963 film), a drama starring Tony Britton
 The Break (2003 film), a TV film featuring Kris Kristofferson
 The Break, alternative name for A Further Gesture, a 1997 film
 The Break (TV series), a 2016 Belgian crime drama, also known as La Trêve
 The Break with Michelle Wolf, a 2018 Netflix series
 The Breaks (1999 film), an American comedy
 The Breaks (2016 film), an American television hip-hop drama
 The Breaks (TV series), a 2017 American drama and a continuation of the 2016 film
 "Break" (Bottom), a British television episode
 Break (Transformers), a fictional character
 The Break, a short film shown at the 2016 Dublin International Film Festival

Music
 Break (music), a percussion interlude or instrumental solo within a longer work of music
 Breakbeat, a broad style of electronic or dance-oriented music

Albums
 Break (Enchant album), 1998
 Break (Mamoru Miyano album), 2009
 Break (One-Eyed Doll album), 2010
 Break (EP), 2006, by The Cinematics

Songs
 "Break", 1972, by Aphrodite's Child
 "The Breaks" (song), 1980, by Kurtis Blow
 "Break" (1984), by Play Dead
 "Break" (1995), by The Gyres
 "Break" (1996), by Staind from the album Tormented
 "Break" (1998), by Fugazi from the album End Hits
 "Break" (2002), by Jurassic 5 from the album Power in Numbers
 "Break" (2006), by Republic of Loose from the album Aaagh!
 "Break" (2006), by The Cinematics
 "Break" (2008), by Alanis Morissette from the album Flavors of Entanglement
 "Break" (Three Days Grace song) (2009)
 "Break" (2013), by Hostyle Gospel from the album Desperation
 "Break" (2015), by Katherine McPhee from the album Hysteria
 "Break" (2015), by No Devotion from the album Permanence
 "Break" (Kero Kero Bonito song), 2016

Other media
 Break.com, a humor website

Other uses
 Big break (jargon), a circumstance which allows an actor or musician to "break into" the industry and achieve fame
 Bone fracture, a medical condition in which there is a break in the continuity of the bone
 Commercial break, in television and radio
 Prison escape, the act of an inmate leaving prison through unofficial or illegal ways
 Section break, in type setting
 Break, an air combat maneuver; see Basic fighter maneuvers
 Breaks, Virginia
 Psychotic break

See also

 
 
 Brake (disambiguation)
 Break a leg, an expression in theatre
 Breakdancing
 Breaking (disambiguation)
 Breakwater (structure)
 Broke (disambiguation)
 Burglary, sometimes called a "break-in"
 Winter break (disambiguation)

ko:브레이크